Rajčanka or Rajčianka is a river in northern Slovakia springing in Strážovské vrchy near Čičmany and pouring into Váh in Žilina.

It forms the border of Lúčanská Malá Fatra Mountains and of Strážovské vrchy. 32 km of its length are navigable.

Cities along its course are: Rajec, Rajecké Teplice, Žilina.

Names and etymology
The original name of the river was Lietava, later Žilinka and only after the founding of Rajec (the 14th century) also Rajčanka (see also Etymology of Rajec).

References

Rivers of Slovakia